Rat Lake is a lake in Cottonwood County, in the U.S. state of Minnesota.

Rat Lake was named for the abundance of muskrats in the area.

See also
List of lakes in Minnesota

References

Lakes of Minnesota
Lakes of Cottonwood County, Minnesota